Kotuku Ngawati (born 16 June 1994) is an Australian swimmer. She competed in the women's 200 metre individual medley event at the 2016 Summer Olympics. Ngawati is of New Zealand Māori descent, and affiliates with the Ngāpuhi iwi (tribe).

References

External links
 
 
 
 
 
 

1994 births
Living people
Australian female freestyle swimmers
Australian female medley swimmers
Olympic swimmers of Australia
Swimmers at the 2016 Summer Olympics
Place of birth missing (living people)
Ngāpuhi people
Australian people of Māori descent
Medalists at the FINA World Swimming Championships (25 m)
World Aquatics Championships medalists in swimming